In geometry, the subtangent and related terms are certain line segments defined using the line tangent to a curve at a given point and the coordinate axes. The terms are somewhat archaic today but were in common use until the early part of the 20th century

Definitions
Let P = (x, y) be a point on a given curve with A = (x, 0) its projection onto the x-axis. Draw the tangent to the curve at P and let T be the point where this line intersects the x-axis. Then TA is defined to be the subtangent at P. Similarly, if normal to the curve at P intersects the x-axis at N then AN is called the subnormal. In this context, the lengths PT and PN are called the tangent and normal, not to be confused with the tangent line and the normal line which are also called the tangent and normal.

Equations
Let φ be the angle of inclination of the tangent with respect to the x-axis; this is also known as the tangential angle.  Then 

So the subtangent is 

and the subnormal is 

The normal is given by

and the tangent is given by

Polar definitions

Let P = (r, θ) be a point on a given curve defined by polar coordinates and let O denote the origin. Draw a line through O which is perpendicular to OP and let T now be the point where this line intersects the tangent to the curve at P. Similarly, let N now be the point where the normal to the curve intersects the line. Then OT and ON are, respectively, called the polar subtangent and polar subnormal of the curve at P.

Polar equations
Let ψ be the angle between the tangent and the ray OP; this is also known as the polar tangential angle. Then

So the polar subtangent is 

and the subnormal is

References

 B. Williamson "Subtangent and Subnormal" and "Polar Subtangent and Polar Subnormal" in An elementary treatise on the differential calculus (1899) p 215, 223  Internet Archive

Curves